"La Lupa" is a short story by Sicilian writer Giovanni Verga, which has been translated as "The She-Wolf". It was published as part of a collection of short stories, Vita dei Campi (Rural Life), in 1880. The story is about a beautiful woman called Gna Pina, called La Lupa (the she-wolf) because of her attitude towards men. She had a daughter, called Maricchia, who was old enough to be married, yet nobody wanted her because of her mother's behaviour. La Lupa falls in love with a man, Nanni, who refuses her and says that he wants her daughter. She then makes her daughter marry him, so that she can always have him near. La Lupa repeatedly seduces Nanni, with her daughter's knowledge, and the story ends with Nanni approaching Gna Pina with an axe.

Novellas